Gordon Marshall may refer to:
 Gordon Marshall (sociologist) (born 1952), sociologist and former Vice-Chancellor of the University of Reading
 Gordon Marshall (cricketer) (born 1935), English cricketer
 Gordon Marshall (footballer, born 1939), English goalkeeper who played for Hearts, Newcastle United and Hibs
 Gordon Marshall (footballer, born 1964), Scottish goalkeeper who played for Falkirk, Celtic and Kilmarnock (son of above)
 Gordon Marshall (a.k.a. Gordy Marshall), a drummer that tours with the rock band the Moody Blues
 Gordon S. Marshall (1919–2015), American electronics entrepreneur